Non-Stop New York (also known as  Lisbon Clipper Mystery) is a 1937 British science fiction crime film  directed by Robert Stevenson and starring John Loder, Anna Lee and Francis L. Sullivan. It is based on the 1936 novel Sky Steward by Ken Attiwill. A woman who can clear an innocent man of the charge of murder is pursued by gangsters onto a luxurious transatlantic flying boat.

Plot
On New Year's Eve 1938 in New York, lawyer Billy Cooper notices stranded English showgirl Jennie Carr (Anna Lee) gazing hungrily at other diners' plates in a restaurant and offers to buy her a meal. However, the restaurant has run out, so he invites her to his apartment. Before they arrive, Abel, another hungry, unemployed person, sneaks in for a chicken leg. Hearing them coming, he hides in a bedroom. When Jennie enters to remove her coat, he begs her not to cause trouble. She sympathizes with his plight and says nothing to Cooper.

Just then, Hugo Brant (Francis L. Sullivan), Cooper’s gangster employer, and his men barge in. They make Jennie leave. When Cooper admits that he is quitting, Brant shoots him dead. To get rid of loose ends, Brant sends Jennie aboard the ocean liner for Southampton, escorted by his sidekick Harrigan. He frames Jennie for robbery.

Meanwhile, Abel, who was caught by the building watchman as he tried to leave, is tried and sentenced to death for Cooper's murder. The woman he insists can exonerate him is in prison, unaware of his plight. Brant and gang member Mortimer travel to England to deal with Jennie.

When Jennie is released from her prison sentence for robbery, her mother introduces her to her new tenant, a priest named Mr. Mortimer. After reading in the newspaper about Abel's impending execution, she goes to Scotland Yard, despite Mortimer's warning that she might become a suspect. She finds that other women have turned up, all claiming to be the missing witness. Inspector Jim Grant is skeptical, and that turns into certainty when Mortimer shows up and discredits her.

Meanwhile, Brant, under the alias of would-be Paraguayan dictator "General Costello", receives a message informing him of developments. The messenger, Spurgeon (Peter Bull), later sneaks back and collects the torn-up pieces to sell to blackmailer Sam Pryor (Frank Cellier). Spurgeon also sells to Inspector Grant the information that Pryor will be flying to New York for blackmail.

With only days before Abel’s execution and insufficient money for airfare, Jennie stows away on the Atlantic Airlines "Lisbon Clipper", a giant transatlantic flying boat. Paying passengers include Brant, 14-year-old violin prodigy Arnold James (Desmond Tester) and his aunt Veronica (Athene Seyler), Pryor and Inspector Grant. Jennie finds an empty compartment which turns out to be Grant's; while he is deciding what to do with her, the aircraft takes off. After she leaves, he informs a crewman he will pay her fare.

When Pryor tries to blackmail Costello, the latter bluffs him into leaving. Pryor then finds out that Jennie has some connection to the inspector; he poses as a police superintendent and learns from her her involvement in the murder. She remarks that a perpetrator could light a match singlehanded, something he saw Costello perform. He brings Jennie to Costello's dinner table, but Costello appears unfazed.

Late that night, by chance, Jennie and Costello are alone in the lounge. He lures the unsuspecting young woman on the open-air balcony, intending to push her over, but Pryor is watching. Now in a stronger bargaining position, he demands not £1,000 but £20,000, this time for not interfering with Costello's plan. Costello seemingly agrees and leads him into the baggage compartment for the money, but instead shoots him dead. There is an unseen witness, however: Arnold. He wakes Grant. Meanwhile, Costello tries to strangle Jennie. When Grant hears her screams, he bursts in, only to be held at gunpoint. Distracted by Arnold, Costello grabs a parachute, makes his way to the cockpit, locks the door, shoots the pilot and jumps out. With the aircraft out of control, Grant goes outside, makes his way over the fuselage clinging to a cable handrail to the cockpit, and unlocks the door for the other pilot, who regains control just in time. When Grant radios for a police cordon for Costello, Arnold sheepishly admits he used part of the parachute to muffle his saxophone.

Cast
As appearing in Non-Stop New York, (main roles and screen credits identified):

 John Loder as Inspector Jim Grant
 Anna Lee as Jennie Carr. 
 Francis L. Sullivan as Hugo Brant, aka "General Costello"
 Frank Cellier as Sam Pryor, a bookmaker
 Desmond Tester as Arnold James, violin child prodigy
 Athene Seyler as Aunt Veronica
 William Dewhurst as Mortimer
  Drusilla Wills as Mrs. Carr, Jennie's mother
Jerry Verno as Steward
 James Pirrie as Billy Cooper
 Ellen Pollock as Miss Harvey
 Arthur Goullett as Abel
 Peter Bull as Spurgeon
 Tony Quinn as Harrigan
 H. G. Stoker as Captain

Production
Largely filmed at Gaumont Graphic studios in Shepherd's Bush, the production relied on a huge flying boat prop, that was realistically created and used for both exterior and interior shots. Recognizing the talent of "specialists at 'make believe'," the film employed the skills of the studio workmen to also build a realistic scale model.

Reception
The New York Times review called it a "well-staged and moderately entertaining Class B melodrama" featuring "a transatlantic airplane as richly imaginative as a front-cover of Popular Science or a Buck Rogers space ship". A more recent review by Leonard Maltin noted the film was a "... Fast-paced, tongue-in-cheek Hitchcock-like yarn ..."

References
Notes

Citations

Bibliography

 Attiwill, Ken. Sky Steward. London: John Long Limited, 1936.
 Dobinson, Colin. Fields of Deception: Britain's Bombing Decoys of World War II. London: Methuen, 200. .
 Lee, Anna with Barbara Roisman Cooper. Anna Lee: Memoir of a Career on General Hospital and in Film. Jefferson, North Carolina: McFarland & Company, 2007. .
 Telotte, J. P. A Distant Technology: Science Fiction Film and the Machine Age.  Lebanon, New Hampshire: University Press of New England, 2000. .

External links
 
 
 

1937 films
1930s crime films
1930s science fiction films
British aviation films
British crime films
British science fiction films
British black-and-white films
Films set in London
1930s English-language films
Films based on Australian novels
Films directed by Robert Stevenson
1930s British films
Science fiction crime films